Stephen F. Austin High School is a secondary school located in unincorporated Fort Bend County, Texas and is named after Stephen F. Austin, who helped lead American settlement of Texas, and who is widely regarded as "The Father of Texas."  The school happens to be only miles from Austin's original colony in present-day Fort Bend County.

Some areas of Sugar Land, Windsor Estates, and the western portion of the community of New Territory are zoned to Austin. On previous occasions employee housing units of the Jester State Prison Farm (including Jester I Unit, Carol Vance Unit, Jester III Unit) were zoned to Austin.

The school, which serves grades 9-12, is a part of the Fort Bend Independent School District. Although having a Sugar Land, Texas address, the school is located outside the city limits of Sugar Land; only students from New Territory live within the City of Sugar Land.

History
Austin opened in 1995 to alleviate overcrowding from Kempner High School and Clements High School. Austin was FBISD's sixth comprehensive high school.

When Travis High School opened, some of Austin's territory was given to Travis, and Austin took some territory from Kempner High School. In the territories, grades 9 and 10 were immediately zoned to the new high school, and grades 11 to 12 continued to go to the previous high schools with a phaseout of one grade per year.

In 2006 the Smithville area, employee housing of the Central Unit state prison (which housed minor dependents of prison employees) was rezoned from Kempner to Austin, with grades 9-10 immediately zoned to Austin, and grades 11-12 zoned to Kempner, with a phasing in by grade. Smithville had since been rezoned back to Kempner. The main portion of the Central Unit remained zoned to Austin until the unit's 2011 closure.

Campus 
Austin is located off of FM 1464, across from Shiloh Lake Estates and Grand Parkway Baptist Church. Surrounding the building are the Summerfield neighborhood to the south, the Safari Texas Ranch banquet on the north side, and the Pheasant Creek neighborhood across a ditch to the east. Nearby are Oyster Creek Elementary School and Macario Garcia Middle School, which are wholly and partially zoned to the school, respectively.

Neighborhoods served 
Several different communities within unincorporated Fort Bend County are zoned to Austin, including Old Orchard, Orchard Lake Estates, Stratford Park Village, Summerfield, Pheasent Creek, Park Pointe, Park Pointe Commons, Oak Lake Estates, Village of Oak Lake, Hidden Lake Estates, Shiloh Lake Estates, and the subdivisions of Aliana south of West Airport, which are all zoned to Macario Garcia Middle School. The eastern half of New Territory, which is within the City of Sugar Land, is also zoned to Austin but through Sartartia Middle School instead.

In previous eras, Austin served sections of Mission Bend and Pecan Grove.

Feeder patterns
Feeder elementary schools to Austin include:
 Oyster Creek Elementary
 Walker Station Elementary
 Lakeview (partial)
 Madden Elementary (partial)
 Holley Elementary (partial)
 Arizona Fleming Elementary (partial)
 Malala Elementary (partial)

Feeder middle schools include:
Macario Garcia Middle School (partial)
Sartartia Middle School (partial)

Notable alumni

Katie Armiger, country musician
Devard Darling, football player for NFL's Kansas City Chiefs
Devaughn Darling, twin brother of Devard Darling and former Florida State Seminoles
Jerry Hughes, football player for Texas Christian University and NFL's Buffalo Bills, Indianapolis Colts
Simone Manuel, swimmer for Stanford, American record holder in 100-yard freestyle, 2016 Olympics gold medalist
Lab Ox, hip-hop music producer
Adam Senn, model
Keshi, singer-songwriter and producer
Jessica Zhu, classical concert pianist
Kerem Bürsin, Turkish actor
Aaron Powell, Founder of Bunch Bikes

References

External links

 
 Dropout Rate and other Statistics

Fort Bend Independent School District high schools
Educational institutions established in 1995
1995 establishments in Texas